"Ball" is a song by American hip hop recording artist T.I., released on October 16, 2012, as the second official single from his eighth studio album Trouble Man: Heavy Is the Head (2012). The song features a guest appearance from fellow American rapper Lil Wayne, as well as production and uncredited vocals from American record producer Rico Love.  In 2013, the song was included on the soundtrack to the film Fast & Furious 6.

Background 
The single, a New Orleans bounce record, was first announced by the song's producer Rico Love, who already had high hopes for the song, stating: "I'm not trying to be cocky, but I pretty much know that that's gonna be a hit record". T.I. unveiled the single's original artwork on June 29, 2012, which was later changed on October 8, 2012, along with the announcement of the single's release date. The song was previewed in the second season of his reality television series T.I. and Tiny: The Family Hustle on episode 5. The episode premiered on September 25, 2012, featuring the preview of it at a listening session in Chicago. The song was released on October 15, 2012, via T.I.'s YouTube channel managed by Atlantic Records, and was available for purchase at iTunes Store on October 16, 2012. Rico Love sampled "Drag Rap", as performed by The Showboys, to produce the song.

Music video 
T.I. shot a video for the song at Hollygrove in New Orleans, featuring cameo appearances of Rico Love, Trae, Mack Maine, Birdman, T.I.'s sons as well as T.I. and Lil Wayne. The photos of it came out on September 25, 2012, via his series #TroubleManTuesdays. The video of behind the scenes was released, on September 28, 2012, and the trailer for it came out on October 16, 2012 - same day it was released on iTunes. The music video premiered on Vh1 Right after T.I.'s show  T.I. and Tiny: The Family Hustle. The video was directed by Marc Klasfeld.

Track listing
Digital download
 "Ball" — 3:25

Credits and personnel
Production – Rico Love, Earl & E

Music Video
Director: Marc Klasfeld
Production Company: Rockhard
Motion Studio: Super77
Producer: Rainer Ziehm
Project Coordinator: Sara Santillan 
Creative Director: Nate Reese, Sean Conner 
Animation: Nate Reese, Chris Meister, Andrew Mark, Scott Ulliman, Chavilah Bennett

Charts

Weekly charts

Year-end charts

Certifications

Release history

References

External links
 

2012 singles
T.I. songs
Grand Hustle Records singles
Songs written by T.I.
Lil Wayne songs
Songs written by Lil Wayne
Songs written by Rico Love
Music videos directed by Marc Klasfeld
Atlantic Records singles
Song recordings produced by Rico Love
2012 songs
Songs written by Earl Hood
Songs written by Eric Goudy